"Lonesome Standard Time" is a song written by Larry Cordle and Jim Rushing, and recorded by American country music artist Kathy Mattea.  It was  released in September 1992 as the first single and title track from her album Lonesome Standard Time.  The song reached number 11 on the Billboard Hot Country Singles & Tracks chart in December 1992.

Chart performance

References

1992 singles
Kathy Mattea songs
Mercury Records singles
Songs written by Larry Cordle
Song recordings produced by Brent Maher
1992 songs
Songs written by Jim Rushing